The Miracle (translit. Chudo) is a 2009 Russian drama film directed by Aleksandr Proshkin. It was entered into the 31st Moscow International Film Festival.

Cast
 Konstantin Khabenskiy as journalist Nikolai Artemyev
 Vitali Kishchenko
 Polina Kutepova
 Sergey Makovetskiy
 Sergei Novikov
 Viktor Shamirov
 Vyacheslav Stepanyan
 Maria Burova as Tatyana
 Kate Tongur as Tatyana's Friend
 Anna Ukolova

References

External links
 

2009 films
2009 drama films
Russian drama films
2000s Russian-language films
Films about Orthodoxy